The Bugatti Bolide is a track-day-focused sportscar developed by Bugatti Engineering GmbH in Wolfsburg, Germany and manufactured in Molsheim, by French automobile manufacturer Bugatti Automobiles S.A.S., revealed online on October 28, 2020. Bugatti announced the Bolide would be the last car ever made with their W16 engine. The Bolide's name comes from the term le bolide, which literally means "the racing car" in French. The fundamental concept of the Bolide is based on a technical draft of Bugatti chief engineer and "Technical Guru" Frank Goetzke.

Specifications and performance 
This increase in power can be attributed to bigger blades in the turbochargers and the different orientation of the turbochargers themselves. According to Bugatti, computer simulations show that the Bolide could lap the Nürburgring in 5 minutes and 23.1 seconds, making it just four seconds slower than the current record holder, the Porsche 919 Hybrid Evo. The Bolide is also simulated to have a lap time at the Circuit de la Sarthe of just 3 minutes and 7.1 seconds, making it 7.6 seconds quicker than the current record holder, the Toyota TS050, which lapped the circuit in 3 minutes and 14.7 seconds.

Design 
The main influence on the Bolide's light curb weight is due to the monocoque and all of its components constructed with titanium, along with nearly all of the body panels constructed in carbon fiber. Additionally, the air scoop of the Bolide is home to a group of dimples, similar to what one finds in a golf ball, that raise up at high speeds, smoothing the laminar flow of air and reducing the aerodynamic drag of the scoop by 10% and a reduction in lift forces by 17%, according to Bugatti. The height of the Bolide, matches the height of the famous Bugatti Le Mans racecar, the Bugatti Type 57C, on which much of the Bolide harkens to.

Production 

Gallery

References 

Bugatti automobiles
Cars introduced in 2021
Sports cars
Flagship vehicles